Tomarovka is an urban-type settlement in Yakovlevsky District of Belgorod Oblast, Russia. 

References

Notes

Sources

Urban-type settlements in Belgorod Oblast
Populated places in Yakovlevsky District, Belgorod Oblast
Belgorodsky Uyezd